José "Cochise" Claussell is a New York percussionist. He is the brother of DJ and music producer Joe Claussell. 

He works very often on his better-known DJ brother's Joe Claussell's own releases and remixes, often released on either of his brother's labels; initially Spiritual Life Music and more currently via Sacred Rhythm Music.

External links
Sacred Rhythm Music the brother Joe Claussell's current label

Musicians from New York (state)
American percussionists
Living people
Year of birth missing (living people)